This is a list of cities, towns and communities in Venezuela. The state capitals are marked with a *.

List

See also
 List of cities in Venezuela by population, a list that only includes cities with no less than 100,000 residents in order of population size (instead of alphabetical order).
 Demographics of Venezuela
 Subdivisions of Venezuela
 List of states of Venezuela by area and population

Notes

References
 Largest cities in Venezuela
 Instituto Nacional de Estadística - Publicaciones/Demografica/Cuadro3

External links

 
Venezuela, List of cities in
Venezuela
Venezuela
Cities